Sally Corporation is a dark ride and animatronic manufacturing company based in Jacksonville, Florida, United States. The company serves amusement parks, attractions, museums, and retail clients worldwide. It offers complete design/build services from concept to installation, including scripting, audio and music production, props and sets, lighting and special effects, electronics, and project management.

History
Sally Corporation was founded in 1977 by high school friends John Fox and John Rob Holland. The company began by manufacturing animatronics for various commercial applications, including an animated figure of President Lyndon Baines Johnson, which was created for Neiman Marcus and later donated to the LBJ Library in Austin, Texas. After Sally had been in business for 6–9 months the second hire for the new company was John Wood who had previously worked with Fox. The first hire was an office manager, Nancy Hafner.  John Fox left the company in 1983. Holland stayed with the company until 1988. In the late 1980s and early 1990s, Sally Corporation went on to develop interactive dark rides. John Wood continues to serve as the Chairman and CEO.

Dark rides

Notes

References

External links

 Sally Corporation's official website

 
American companies established in 1977
Amusement ride manufacturers
Animatronics companies
 
Manufacturing companies established in 1977
LaVilla, Jacksonville
1977 establishments in Florida
Technology companies based in the Jacksonville area
Technology companies based in Florida
Robotics companies of the United States
Multinational companies based in Jacksonville